Thank You St. Jude is an album by American singer-songwriter Peter Case, released in 2001.

The album consists of rearranged acoustic versions of songs previously recorded by Case or favorites from his live concerts.

Critical reception

Music critic Denise Sullivan of Allmusic praised the album, writing "This disc is an essential part of the Case catalog – a document of the state of the acoustic rock nation he had a hand in reviving in the mid-'80s and a testament to the evolution and staying power of his compositions. At the same time, new fans, particularly of acoustic folk, will find this a good introduction to the rich catalog of one of the most hardworking and consistently innovative songwriters in the hard-rockin' folk section."

Track listing
All songs written by Peter Case unless otherwise noted.
"Ice Water" – 2:57
"Beyond the Blues" (Case, Bob Neuwirth, Tom Russell) – 3:44
"Someday Blues" (Sleepy John Estes) – 3:18
"Put Down the Gun" – 3:54
"Two Angels" – 4:01
"Ginseng Blues" (Kentucky Ramblers) – 3:15
"Hidden Love" – 4:09
"Travellin' Light" (Case, Neuwirth) – 3:48
"Poor Old Tom" – 4:13
"Leavin' Home" (Charlie Poole) – 3:21
"Entella Hotel" – 5:19
"One More Mile" – 3:01
"4th of July/Christmas Rag" (Case, Neuwirth) – 3:07

Personnel
Peter Case – vocals, guitar, harmonica
Sandy Chila – drums, banjo, harmonium, percussion
David Jackson – upright bass
David Perales – violin, harmony vocals

Production
Peter Case – producer
Michael Meltzer – engineer
Tom Lukens – engineer
Doug Schwartz – mastering
Greg Allen – package design, photography
Doug Erb – illustrations

References

2001 albums
Peter Case albums